Randall Kirk Myers (born September 19, 1962) is an American former professional baseball pitcher who played in Major League Baseball (MLB) for the New York Mets, Cincinnati Reds, San Diego Padres, Chicago Cubs, Baltimore Orioles, and Toronto Blue Jays, between  and . He batted and threw left-handed.

Early life
Randy Myers grew up in Vancouver, Washington. His father was an auto mechanic and a machinist. He is a graduate of Evergreen High School and Clark College. Myers was drafted in the first round (ninth overall) of the 1982 amateur draft.

Professional career
Myers began his Major League career with the New York Mets in 1985 under the management of Davey Johnson, and was a member of the Mets 1986 World Series-winning team (although he did not appear on the Mets' postseason roster then, he was given a belated World Series ring nine years later in 1995). Myers became a closer in 1988 as he platooned with Roger McDowell after Jesse Orosco left for the Los Angeles Dodgers.

Myers was traded to the Reds in 1990 for closer John Franco, and became one of the league's elite closers and the most successful member of the Nasty Boys trio, which also included Rob Dibble and Norm Charlton, while being selected as an All-Star in 1990. In 1990, Myers won his second World Series ring as the Reds swept the Oakland Athletics. In 1991, the Reds experimented with Myers as a starter, a move that proved highly unsuccessful as he posted a record of 6 wins and 13 losses.

In 1992, Myers became the closer for the Padres. After only one season in San Diego, Myers was a Cub in 1993 where he posted his best statistical season with a then National League record 53 saves. In a September 28, 1995 game vs. the Astros, Myers was attacked on the field by a fan named John Murray at Wrigley Field after giving up a two-run, eighth inning home run to James Mouton that put the Astros up 9–7. Fearing that Murray was armed, Myers used his martial arts training to bring Murray to the ground, then held him down until security guards could get him. The Cubs rallied to win 12–11 in 10 innings.  In 1994 and 1995, Myers earned his second and third All-Star selections. After the 1995 season, Myers became a member of the Orioles where he had two more solid seasons, highlighted by an All-Star selection in 1997, when he saved 45 games. Myers had 28 saves for the Blue Jays in his final season, 1998, before being traded back to the Padres after being claimed on waivers. Though he was under contract for both 1999 and 2000, he did not pitch in the Major Leagues after 1998.

In a 14-year Major League career, Myers compiled a 3.19 ERA, 347 saves, 44 wins, 63 losses and struck out 884 batters in 884.2 innings. As of the end of the 2019 Major League Baseball season, Myers ranks 12th all-time in saves, and is a member of the 300 save club.

In 2000, Myers earned a salary of US$6,916,667.00 while unable to pitch due to a damaged shoulder. Most of his 1999 and 2000 seasons were spent receiving treatment after undergoing rotator cuff surgery in 1999; his injury resulted in a legal dispute between the Padres and their insurance carrier after the carrier denied an $8 million claim due to Myers' inability to play.

The Padres' 1998 waiver claim of Myers is considered one of the biggest blunders in the history of the waiver wire. The Padres did not want Myers, mostly because of the $12 million and two additional years remaining on his contract as well as the fact that they already had an established closer in Trevor Hoffman, but placed a waiver claim in order to prevent him from going to the rival Atlanta Braves. They expected the Blue Jays to rescind their waiver claim, but the Blue Jays instead allowed the waiver claim to go through, leaving them responsible for the rest of his contract.

In October 1990, Myers was featured on the 18-ounce box of Wheaties breakfast cereal along with fellow Cincinnati Reds 1990 World Series champions Eric Davis, José Rijo, Barry Larkin, Chris Sabo, and Hal Morris.

Personal life
For many years during his pro baseball career he assisted in coaching the women's basketball team at his alma mater, Clark Community College. He is widely involved in charities in Vancouver through his Randy Myers Foundation. He also has a lifelong involvement in martial arts.

Clark College did not field a baseball team after the 1992 season, but by 2011, thanks in large part of Myers' efforts fundraising and spearheading the program's revival, Clark again started playing baseball in 2011.

See also

 List of athletes on Wheaties boxes
 List of Major League Baseball annual saves leaders

References

External links

Randy Myers at SABR (Baseball BioProject)
Randy Myers at Baseball Biography
Randy Myers at Ultimate Mets Database

1962 births
Living people
American expatriate baseball players in Canada
American League All-Stars
American League saves champions
Baseball players from Washington (state)
Baltimore Orioles players
Chicago Cubs players
Cincinnati Reds players
Clark College alumni
Columbia Mets players
Jackson Mets players
Kingsport Mets players
Lynchburg Mets players
National League All-Stars
National League Championship Series MVPs
National League saves champions
New York Mets players
San Diego Padres players
Sportspeople from Vancouver, Washington
Tacoma Rainiers players
Toronto Blue Jays players
Tidewater Tides players